Estádio Municipal Colosso do Tapajós, commonly known as 'Colosso do Tapajós, is a football stadium located in Santarém, Brazil. It is the home stadium of São Francisco Futebol Clube and São Raimundo Esporte Clube. It is owned by the Pará State Government and the Santarém City Hall, and it has a maximum capacity of 19,524 people. The stadium is named after the senator Jader Barbalho.

History
The stadium was inaugurated on March 11, 1987, when São Raimundo and São Francisco drew 1–1. The first goal at the stadium was scored by São Francisco's Valdir Almeida. The currently attendance record stands at 20,000 people, set on that day.

References

Football venues in Pará
Sports venues in Pará